Heiða Karine Jóhannesdóttir Mobeck (born 7 May 1987 in Trondheim, Norway) is a Norwegian jazz musician (tuba and bass guitar), daughter of the artists Kari Elise Mobeck (Lademoen Kunstnerverksteder) and Jóhannes B. Sigurjónsson (NTNU), and known for playing in a series of bands and recordings.

Career 
Mobeck studies music technology on the Jazz program at Trondheim Musikkonsevatorium, and here she was involved in bands with fellow students, like "Your Headlights Are On", "Avalanche", "Skadedyr" and "Hanna Paulsberg Concept".

Honors 
2015: Recipient of the Sparebank 1 JazZstipendiat, within the duo Skrap together with Anja Lauvdal

Discography

Her own projects 
Within "Your Headlights Are On»
2011: Your Headlights Are On (Dayladore Collective)

Within "Avalanche»
2012: Whiteout (Riot Factory)

Within Broen
2013: Broen/Invader Ace: The split jump drug EP (10" EP) (Kakao Musikk)
2015: Yoga''' (LP) (Nabovarsel)

Within Skadedyr
2014: Kongekrabbe (Hubro Records)
2016: Culturen (Hubro Records)

 Collaborations 
With Synne Sanden
2013: Climbing The Rainbow (Riot Factory)

Cover design for Hanna Paulsberg Concept
2012: Waltz For Lilli'' (Øra Fonogram)

References

External links 
MUMMU on Vimo

21st-century Norwegian tubists
Norwegian jazz tubists
Women tubists
Norwegian jazz composers
Norwegian University of Science and Technology alumni
Norwegian people of Icelandic descent
Musicians from Trondheim
1987 births
Living people